Estero is a village in Lee County, Florida, United States. As of the 2020 census, the population was 36,939. During the  2010 census, Estero was an unincorporated community, or census-designated place, the population at that time was 22,612. Estero incorporated as a village in 2014. In 2019, the village's estimated population was 33,871. Estero is part of the Cape Coral-Fort Myers, Florida Metropolitan Statistical Area.

Estero is the home of Hertz Arena, which hosts the home games for the Florida Everblades ECHL ice hockey team. Florida Gulf Coast University is located just north of the Estero village limits.

History
Mound Key, located in Estero Bay, is believed to have been the ceremonial center of the Calusa Indians when they were encountered by the Spanish in the early 1500s. German homesteader Gustave Damkohler began planting mulberry trees in 1882 along the Estero River, followed by others who established fish camps and the region's first citrus groves. In 1894, Damkohler donated property to the followers of Cyrus Teed, who proposed a theory that people live on the inside of the Earth's outer skin, and that celestial bodies are all contained inside the hollow Earth. This theory, which he called Koreshan Unity, drew followers to occupy and develop Damkohler's original  tract. They were business-oriented and lived communally, prospering enough to found their own political party ("The Progressive Liberty Party") and incorporate the town on September 1, 1904, as Estero.  At the behest of other local officials, the Florida legislature abolished the municipality of Estero in 1907. 

The 1908 death of Teed (who claimed to be immortal) was a critical blow to the group's faith, whose membership dwindled into the 1960s. The foundation remains as "The College of Life Foundation", which contributed (for example) at least $25,000 to the Gulf Shore Playhouse in or around 2007. The Koreshans' original tract is now owned by Florida as the Koreshan State Historic Site.

Access to Estero was greatly improved in the 1920s when the Tamiami Trail, a highway linking Tampa and Miami, and two railroads were built through the area.  The Tamiami Trail was fully complete in 1928.  The Atlantic Coast Line Railroad (via its Fort Myers Southern Railroad subsidiary) began service through Estero in 1925.  A competing railroad, the Seaboard Air Line Railroad (via its Seaboard-All Florida Railway subsidiary) also began service through Estero in 1927.  Today, the former Atlantic Coast Line tracks are still in place east of US 41 and have been owned by Seminole Gulf Railway since 1987.  The former Seaboard tracks were removed in the 1940s and its former route west of US 41 is now an FPL power line corridor.

Estero incorporated as a village on December 31, 2014.

Geography

The Village of Estero is located in southern Lee County at  (26.432237, –81.809447). It is bordered to the south by the city of Bonita Springs and to the north by unincorporated San Carlos Park and Three Oaks.

Historically and culturally, the heart of Estero is the spring-fed Estero River, which flows to Estero Bay. Some of the earliest settlers of the area (notably the Alvarez, Fernandez, Johnson, and Soto families) were fishing families that lived on Mound Key, a mangrove-ringed island that dominates Estero Bay. During the early 20th century, these families moved upriver to the settlement which came to be known as Estero. Estero is also the location of a utopian community called the Koreshan Unity, which is now preserved as the Koreshan State Historic Site. Until the 1970s, most settlement and development in Estero was near the river.

Demographics

In the past, during the census of 2000, there were 9,503 people, 4,608 households, and 3,336 families residing in the CDP. The racial makeup of the CDP was 97.43% White, 0.64% African American, 0.11% Native American, 0.35% Asian, 0.01% Pacific Islander, 0.77% from other races, and 0.69% from two or more races. Hispanic or Latino of any race were 3.19% of the population.

There were 4,608 households, out of which 10.0% had children under the age of 18 living with them, 68.2% were married couples living together, 2.8% had a female householder with no husband present, and 27.6% were non-families. 23.4% of all households were made up of individuals, and 12.4% had someone living alone who was 65 years of age or older.  The average household size was 2.01 and the average family size was 2.31.

In the CDP, the population was spread out, with 9.2% under the age of 18, 4.9% from 18 to 24, 14.1% from 25 to 44, 31.1% from 45 to 64, and 40.6% who were 65 years of age or older.  The median age was 61 years. For every 100 females, there were 93.1 males.  For every 100 females age 18 and over, there were 92.6 males.

As of the census 2019 American Community Survey 5-Year Estimates, the median income for a household in the village of Estero, Florida was $82,054, the median income for a family was $98,989, and the median income for Married-couple families was $101,086.

The significant and sustained increase in median income in Estero can be attributed to a long-term influx of affluent households through inbound migration. In the past, the median income for a household in the CDP was $43,734, and the median income for a family was $51,227.  In the past, Males had a median income of $38,886 versus $27,883 for females.  In the past, the per capita income for the CDP was $30,521.   In the past, about 1.9% of families and 3.2% of the population were below the poverty line, including 1.1% of those under age 18 and 3.2% of those age 65 or over.

Economy
On May 7, 2013, the Hertz Corporation announced it was moving its corporate headquarters and about 750 jobs to Estero from its former bases at Park Ridge, New Jersey and Tulsa, Oklahoma. Hertz built a $75 million building at the southeast corner of US-41 and Williams Road on a previously vacant lot and cleared parcel that already contained a retention pond. The land is immediately south of Corkscrew Village and about a mile north of Coconut Point Mall.

References

External links

Estero Chamber of Commerce
History of Estero's founding

1894 establishments in Florida
Former census-designated places in Florida
Former census-designated places in Lee County, Florida
Populated coastal places in Florida on the Gulf of Mexico
Populated places established in 1894
Villages in Florida
Populated places in Lee County, Florida